West Melcher is an unincorporated community in Reserve Township, Parke County, in the U.S. state of Indiana, located east of Montezuma.

Geography

References

Unincorporated communities in Indiana
Unincorporated communities in Parke County, Indiana